Yazhini is a 2015 - 2016 Tamil-language soap opera that aired Monday through Friday on IBC Tamil from 20 November 2015 to 2 September 2016 at 7:30PM for 244 episodes, starred  Nikila, Dhinesh, Shravan, Dev, Asha Rani and Divya.

The show was produced by Radaan MediaworksRaadhika and director by Sundar K. Vijayan. The drama about Sri Lanka Tamil refugees and their struggles in Tamil Nadu. Yazhini, a Sri Lankan refugee, who lives with her younger sister and brother in her aunt's home. This story pinned around her life.

Cast
 Nikila-yazhini
 Dhinesh
 Shravan
 Dev
 Asha Rani
 Divya
 Vasanthi Vishwanathan
 Thanalaskhmi
 Ashritha
 Southarya Shetty
 Denakaran
 Veera
 Vinoth
 Mithun
 Harish
 Santhosh
 Nagaraj

International broadcast
  In Sri Lanka Tamil Channel on Shakthi TV. It airs Monday through Friday at 06:00PM (SST) with Sinhala Subtitle.

References

External links
 IBC Tamil 

IBC Tamil TV television series
2015 Tamil-language television series debuts
Tamil-language television shows
2016 Tamil-language television series endings